The 2019 LIU Sharks football team represents both the LIU Post and LIU Brooklyn campuses of Long Island University in the 2019 NCAA Division I FCS football season. They are led by 22nd year head coach Bryan Collins and play their home games at Bethpage Federal Credit Union Stadium. They play as a first–year member of the Northeast Conference. This is the first season that the LIU Sharks are competing as a team following the merger of the two LIU campuses' athletic departments in the summer of 2019.

The Sharks finished winless in their first season. A month after the season ended, starting quarterback Clay Beathard was stabbed to death in Nashville, Tennessee.

Previous season
This is the first season that the LIU Sharks are competing as a team. Their immediate predecessor, the 2018 LIU Post Pioneers, went 10–1, 9–0 to finish in first place in the Northeast-10 Conference. They made the NCAA Division II Playoffs where they were defeated in the first round by Slippery Rock. They finished ranked at #21 in the Division II Coaches' Poll and received the 2019 Division II Lambert Cup from the Eastern College Athletic Conference (ECAC) and Metropolitan New York Football Writers, signifying them as the best football team in the East in Division II football.

Preseason

Preseason coaches' poll
The NEC released their preseason coaches' poll on July 24, 2019. The Sharks were picked to finish in 8th (last) place.

Preseason All–Northeast Conference team
The LIU Sharks were the only conference team to have no players selected for the 2019 All–Northeast Conference Football Preseason Team.

Schedule

Source:

Game summaries
Series records and last meetings are from the LIU Post Pioneers, the predecessor to the LIU Sharks.

at South Dakota State

Sacred Heart

at Wagner

at Duquesne

at Bryant

Saint Francis (PA)

at Central Connecticut

at Robert Morris

at Villanova

Merrimack

References

LIU
LIU Sharks football seasons
College football winless seasons
LIU Sharks football